Gregory Hatanaka is an American independent filmmaker and film distributor based in Los Angeles, California.

Career
Hatanaka is the founder of film distribution and production company Cinema Epoch and Cineridge Entertainment. He first became involved in film distribution working for Headliner Productions on the re-release of films by director Edward D. Wood, Jr. He founded Phaedra Cinema to distribute international films in the U.S. With a specialization in cult films, Phaedra released such films as Toshimichi Ohkawa's Nobody (1994), Cha Chuen Lee's Once Upon a Time in Triad Society (1996), and Jimmy Wang Yu's Master of the Flying Guillotine (1975) and Toshiharu Ikeda's Evil Dead Trap (1988). Hatanaka has explained the origins of his interest in Asian cult cinema: "I grew up going to the drive-ins, watching Sonny Chiba movies-- I've always had a passion for that."

In 1998, Phaedra films released the two Nikkatsu Roman porno films, Masaru Konuma's Wife to Be Sacrificed (1974) and Noboru Tanaka's A Woman Called Sada Abe (1975) on a theatrical double-bill. The films premiered in San Francisco in June, opening to very favorable reviews. The films premiered on October 30, 1998 and then played for a week at the Monica 4-Plex theater in Los Angeles.

Hatanaka's directing credits include Until the Night (2004) starring Norman Reedus, the award-winning film Mad Cowgirl (2006), and Samurai Cop 2: Deadly Vengeance (2015). He collaborated with the distribution company Circle Releasing on the release of the John Woo film The Killer (1989) under the guidance of crime novelist George Pelecanos. His subsequent films were Violent Blue (2011) and Blue Dream (2013). He distributed the film The Terrorist (1997) by Santosh Sivan, which was presented by John Malkovich.

Hatanaka has distributed the works of filmmakers and directors including Satyajit Ray, Claude Chabrol, André Téchiné, and Leni Riefenstahl, as well as films with such award-winning actors as Catherine Deneuve, Ewan McGregor, Billy Bob Thornton, Vince Vaughn, Colin Firth, Bridget Fonda, Isabelle Adjani, Catherine Zeta-Jones, Isabelle Huppert, and Gérard Depardieu.

Filmography

As director
Until the Night (2004)
Mad Cowgirl (2006)
Violent Blue (2011)
Blue Dream (2013)
Hunter (2015)
Samurai Cop 2: Deadly Vengeance (2015)
Darling Nikki (2016)
Choke (2020) - not to be confused with the 2008 movie of the same name which was based on the novel by Chuck Pahlaniuk
Heartbeat (2020)

As distributor
Agantuk by Satyajit RayA Woman Called Sada Abe by Noboru Tanaka starring Junko MiyashitaBlack Cat by Stephen ShinBlood Tea and Red String by Christiane CegavskeBlue Juice by Carl PrechezerButterfly by Matt CimberFever Pitch by Nick HornbyGirl Lost by Robin BainGozu by Takashi MiikeLa Séparation by Christian VincentL'Ennui by Cédric KahnLes biches by Claude ChabrolLife Tastes Good by Philip Kan GotandaMaster of the Flying Guillotine by Jimmy Wang YuMikres Aphrodites by Nikos KoundourosMy Favorite Season by André TéchinéOlympia by Leni RiefenstahlPrivate Lessons by Alan Myerson
R'Xmas by Abel Ferrara
Samurai Cop by Amir Shervan
South of Heaven, West of Hell by Dwight Yoakam
Spring in a Small Town by Fei Mu
The Killer by John Woo
The Sinister Urge by Edward D. Wood, Jr.
The Terrorist by Santosh Sivan
Tokyo Decadence by Ryu Murakami
Un pont entre deux rives by Gérard Depardieu
Wife to Be Sacrificed by Masaru Konuma starring Naomi Tani
Yellow by Chris Chan Lee

References

External links

Cinema Epoch site

American film directors of Japanese descent
Film distributors (people)
Living people
Year of birth missing (living people)